General elections were held in the Netherlands on 26 April 1933. The Roman Catholic State Party remained the largest party in the House of Representatives, winning 28 of the 100 seats.

Results

References

General elections in the Netherlands
Netherlands
1933 in the Netherlands
April 1933 events
1933 elections in the Netherlands